Emilio Sánchez was the defending champion, but lost in the first round this year.

Guillermo Pérez Roldán won the title, defeating Marián Vajda 6–3, 7–6 in the final.

Seeds

  Emilio Sánchez (first round)
  Johan Kriek (quarterfinals)
  Joakim Nyström (semifinals)
  Jonas Svensson (first round)
  Milan Šrejber (second round)
  Thomas Muster (second round)
  Eric Jelen (first round)
  Jonathan Canter (first round)

Draw

Finals

Top half

Bottom half

External links
 1987 BMW Open draw

Singles